Childe Harold was a saloon and entertainment venue located in Washington, D.C.'s Dupont Circle. It was first opened by Bill Heard Jr. in 1967 and began hosting live music during the 1970s, becoming one of the first nightspot places in Dupont Circle. 

The Childe Harold was named after the poem Childe Harold's Pilgrimage by Lord Byron. It featured a basement and main level, where the music was performed. It is known to have hosted The Ramones, Al Jarreau, Son Seals, Bonnie Raitt, Emmylou Harris, and Bruce Springsteen. Springsteen's 1973 contract, detailing his time spent at Childe Harold, was hung on the wall of the venue, displaying that he was paid $750 for three nights of performances. After the early 70's the venue ended live music performances, citing the increasing cost of musical acts. The venue was known for a diverse crowd "from jocks to hippies". Childe Harold was forced to close in 2007 after leasing agreements could not be reached.

References 

1967 establishments in Washington, D.C.
Dupont Circle
Drinking establishments in Washington, D.C.